Samsjøen is a lake in Trøndelag county, Norway. The  lake sits on the border of the municipalities of Midtre Gauldal and Melhus. The lake has a dam at the northwest end, which is used for hydroelectric power production. The water flows out of the lake and into the Lundesokna river which flows into the river Gaula.

See also
List of lakes in Norway

References

Midtre Gauldal
Melhus
Lakes of Trøndelag
Reservoirs in Norway